Zoe Adjonyoh (born 1977) is a British writer and cook, founder of "Zoe's Ghana Kitchen", a Ghanaian pop-up restaurant brand, which is also the title of her debut cookbook.

Biography
She was born in Essex, England, in the late 1970s to a Ghanaian father and an Irish mother, who had met in Kilburn, North London. Adjonyoh taught herself to cook the foods of her father's home country, and she began a restaurant called Zoe's Ghana Kitchen in her home in East London, after the popularity of a stall she set up selling peanut stew when a local arts festival was taking place nearby in 2010. Although she had started making and selling Ghanaian food in order to fund her Creative Writing MA at Goldsmiths, University of London, her tutor suggested that to focus on her business might be a better way into writing the memoir she was working on. She has since run pop-up restaurants in different London venues as well as in other places, including Berlin and New York. She has said: "The point of Ghana Kitchen is to take people on a food journey where they can try ingredients and flavours they've never tasted before. There's that sense of adventure and I'm trying to guide people with that."

She is the author of a 2017 book also called Zoe's Ghana Kitchen, about which Ruby Tandoh said: "If you are what you eat, then Adjonyoh's debut cookbook, Zoe's Ghana Kitchen, is a kind of edible portrait: a celebratory, intelligent, often chaotic rendering of the person she is, and of her heritage." According to Wendell Brock's review of the book: "In her delightfully quirky book, Adjonyoh shares her spin on the food of her Ghanaian father’s homeland, with some funny side notes on her experiences in Ghana and how she's mashed up her Irish mum and her African father's native cuisines. There are even soundtracks to play while cooking and eating. I suspect there’s a memoir in the making here."

Adjonyoh contributed a short piece about her father to the 2019 anthology New Daughters of Africa, edited by Margaret Busby.

Bibliography
 Zoe's Ghana Kitchen, Mitchell Beazley, 2017,

Awards and recognition
Adjonyoh won the 2018 Culinary Iconoclast Award. In 2018, she was appointed as a judge for the Great Taste Awards, "the Oscars of the food and drink world".

References

External links
 Zoe's Ghana Kitchen website.
 Zoe Adjonyoh, "Zoe's Ghana Kitchen Recipes: From Jollof Fried Chicken to Spinach Agushi Curry", The Independent, 2 June 2017.
 "This Young London Chef Wants You to Try  Food", Oprah.com, July 2017.
 Daisy Meager, "My life in food: Zoe Adjonyoh" (interview), Love Food, 9 April 2018.
 Bobbie Edsor, "Zoe Adjonyoh on why we’re all loving African cuisine", ASDA Good Living, 16 July 2018.

Alumni of Goldsmiths, University of London
Black British women writers
British gastronomes
English food writers
English people of Ghanaian descent
Living people
Writers from Essex
1977 births